Yugul are a blues band from Ngukurr, a small community in southeast Arnhem Land. They are the first Aboriginal blues band in the Northern Territory. They released their debut album in 2003 with help from Charles Darwin University.

Discography
Albums
 Blues Across the River (2003) - Skinnyfish Music

References

Northern Territory musical groups
Indigenous Australian musical groups